Conjunto Nacional may refer to:
Conjunto Nacional (Brasília), a shopping mall in Brasília, Brazil
Conjunto Nacional (São Paulo), a shopping mall in São Paulo, Brazil

Buildings and structures disambiguation pages